Artyom Zagidulin (born 8 August 1995) is a Russian professional ice hockey goaltender who is currently playing with Lukko in the Liiga. He previously played for the Calgary Flames of the National Hockey League (NHL). Prior to NHL, he played for Metallurg Magnitogorsk and Kunlun Red Star of the Kontinental Hockey League (KHL).

Playing career
Prior to NHL, he played for Metallurg Magnitogorsk and Kunlun Red Star of the Kontinental Hockey League (KHL).

On 30 March 2019, Zagidulin signed as an undrafted free agent to a one-year, entry-level contract with the Calgary Flames of the National Hockey League (NHL). After attending the Flames 2019 training camp, Zagidulin was assigned to begin the 2019–20 season with AHL affiliate, the Stockton Heat.

In his first season in North America, Zagidulin made 30 appearances with the Heat, establishing a record of 16-7-4 with a 3.07 goals against average and a .898 save percentage. As an impending restricted free agent, Zagidullin was signed to a one-year extension with the Flames on 16 June 2020.

Leaving the Flames after parts of two seasons within the organization, Zagidulin familiarly returned to begin the 2021–22 season with Metallurg Magnitogorsk of the KHL. Used sparingly in featuring in just 3 games, Zagidulin opted to leave Magnitogorsk, joining Finnish club, Lukko of the Liiga, for the remainder of the season on 18 November 2021.

Career statistics

References

External links
 

1995 births
Living people
Calgary Flames players
HC Kunlun Red Star players
Lukko players
Metallurg Magnitogorsk players
Russian ice hockey goaltenders
Stalnye Lisy players
Stockton Heat players
Undrafted National Hockey League players
Yuzhny Ural Orsk players
Zauralie Kurgan players
People from Magnitogorsk
Sportspeople from Chelyabinsk Oblast